Elmer Miller (July 28, 1890 – November 28, 1944) is a former professional baseball player in Major League Baseball. He played for the St. Louis Cardinals, New York Yankees, and Boston Red Sox. In his career, he posted a .243 batting average (343-for-1414) with 16 home runs and 154 RBI.

External links 
Baseball Reference.com

St. Louis Cardinals players
New York Yankees players
Boston Red Sox players
1890 births
1944 deaths
Baseball players from Ohio
Major League Baseball center fielders
Sportspeople from Sandusky, Ohio
Mobile Sea Gulls players
Duluth White Sox players
Baltimore Orioles (IL) players
St. Paul Saints (AA) players
Burials in Wisconsin